Cape Uivak is a cape located in the northern part of Labrador in the province of Newfoundland and Labrador, Canada.

References

Mountains of Newfoundland and Labrador